Eamon Dunne, nicknamed "The Don", was a major Irish organised crime figure from Finglas, North Dublin. He led a gang based in Finglas, Cabra, and Ballymun, who were involved in drug dealing, armed robbery, extortion and murder. He took control of the gang after the murder of crime boss Martin "Marlo" Hyland, who was shot dead in December 2006, and Gardaí suspect that Dunne, who was one of Hyland's closest associates, drove the getaway car for the killers.

Dunne was linked to 17 gangland murders over the next three years, as he consolidated his position by having rivals and suspected Garda informers killed.

Death
Dunne's increasing paranoia and unstable behaviour eventually led to his own gang members turning against him and they conspired with others to have him killed. Gardaí believe a major Irish drug trafficker based in Spain, who supplied Dunne's gang with drugs and a veteran crime boss based in North Dublin, who acted as a mentor to Dunne, were angry at Dunne for bringing too much Garda attention to gangland. Together with some of Dunne's closest associates they are suspected of organising his murder and of hiring a gang of young criminals from the north inner city to actually carry out the hit.

Thirty-four-year-old Dunne was murdered as he attended a friend's birthday party at a pub in Cabra on 23 April 2010. A hit team of four men arrived in a car, one of them waved his gun around and warned smokers outside the pub to disperse. He then guarded the front door. Two masked gunmen entered and shot Dunne several times in the head and body, in front of his seventeen-year-old daughter, before escaping in a waiting car. The first gunman shot Dunne twice in the chest & once in the head, with the second gunman also performing the "Mozambique Drill" on him as he lay on the ground. Despite his bodyguard and a number of close associates being present, nobody made any attempt to prevent the murder. At the time of his death, Dunne was on bail and awaiting trial in connection with a €900,000 robbery of a cash-in-transit van in Celbridge in 2007. No one has been convicted of his murder.

Victims

While not pulling the trigger himself, Dunne was suspected of ordering at least a dozen gangland murders in the years before his death.

The victims included:

John Paul Joyce (30), a drug trafficker, shot dead and body dumped near Dublin Airport in January 2010.
David Thomas (43), shot dead in Finglas in October 2009.
Paul Smyth (34), from Finglas, killed and dumped in Balbriggan, June 2009.
Michael Murray (41), shot dead in Finglas, March 2009.
Graham McNally (34), formerly a close associate, shot dead in Finglas, January 2009.
Michael 'Roly' Cronin (35), a major drug dealer, and James Maloney (26), his driver, shot dead in Dublin city centre, January 2009.
Paul 'Farmer' Martin (30), a convicted bank robber, shot dead at a pub in Finglas, August 2008.
Trevor Walsh (33), shot dead at Kippure Park, Finglas, two days after he was released from prison, in July 2008.
John Daly (27), shot dead as he sat in a taxi in Finglas, October 2007, two months after his release from prison, where he served a nine-year sentence for armed robbery.

References

Further reading 

Williams, Paul. "Crime Wars". Merlin Publishing, 2008. 
Williams, Paul. "Badfellas". Penguin Ireland, 2011. 

Irish drug traffickers
Irish crime bosses
Deaths by firearm in the Republic of Ireland
People murdered in the Republic of Ireland
Irish gangsters
Irish murder victims
Year of birth missing
2010 deaths
Unsolved murders in Ireland
Criminals from Dublin (city)
2010 murders in the Republic of Ireland